Loralai Division is an administrative division of Balochistan Province, Pakistan. It was bifurcated from Zhob division in 2021. The division is consist of Barkhan, Loralai, Musakhail and Duki districts.

References

Divisions of Balochistan